is a Japanese fantasy light novel series written by Kei Azumi and illustrated by Mitsuaki Matsumoto. It began serialization online in 2012 on the user-generated novel publishing website Shōsetsuka ni Narō, and it moved to the AlphaPolis website in 2016. It was also later acquired by AlphaPolis, who have published the series since May 2013. A manga adaptation with art by Kotora Kino has been serialized online via AlphaPolis' manga website since 2015. An anime television series adaptation by C2C aired from July to September 2021. A second season has been announced.

Characters

Makoto Misumi is the main protagonist of this series. He is one of three Earth dwellers who was summoned to the Goddess' World. Originally meant to be the only person to be sent to the other world as per the contract between his parents and the Goddess, due to her own preferences in beauty standards, she abandons and throws Makoto to the edge of her world into the Wasteland, while secretly kidnapping two other people from Earth and sending them to her world as Heroes. Tsukuyomi, the Moon God of Earth who worked as the middleman for the completion of the contract, helped Makoto and provided him with his blessing and told him to be free and live as he wishes to. In the Goddess' World, he is also known by the alias "Raidou Kuzunoha" (in WN/LN) or "Makoto Kuzunoha" (in Manga/Anime), a powerful merchant and skilled teacher.

After an accident in which Makoto destroyed her shrine gate, she makes a pact with Makoto to learn more about the way of  the Samurai. Her special ability is being able to use illusion mists to distort her opponents, as well as creating a Demiplane (fandom refers to it as Asora) which she uses as a mediating space. Tomoe later falls in love with Makoto, becoming one of his lovers.

She makes a pact with Makoto (without his permission) after being convinced by Tomoe. Mio is prone to easily getting worked up over the smallest slight; but feeding her will calm her down. Her special ability is being able to harness dark magic, an element which is able to swallow other forms of magic. She later falls in love with Makoto, becoming one of his lovers. 

, previously known as Larva, was a Lich who sought endless knowledge, in particular the path to becoming a Grant, humans who have traveled to other worlds, whether successfully or not. After some convincing from Makoto due to his desire to learn more about magic, he makes a pact with Makoto and is presently in servitude of Makoto Misumi.

Emma is an orc who was saved by Makoto from a two-headed Liz while on her way to sacrificing herself to Shen (which later turned out to be a ploy set up by the demon race). After Makoto resolves the issue for her and the entire orc village, she becomes the secretary of Makoto Misumi and she acts as the Supervisor of the Demiplane.

Beren is an elder dwarf that Makoto Misumi met after Tomoe rescues him from the Black Spider of Calamity and is currently one of the blacksmiths of the Demiplane and the Kuzunoha Company.

Toa is an adventurer who came from Tsige to Zetsuya to look for her family's long lost dagger as well as to get stronger. Due to her failing to complete one of her quests, she fell into large amounts of debt and was forced to subject herself to prostitution (manga)/human magic experimentation (anime) by high-ranking adventurers in Zetsuya, before being rescued by Tomoe and Mio. Her face resembles that of Makoto's junior on Earth, named Hasegawa Nukumi, whom Makoto feels a certain affection towards.

Rinon is Toa's younger sister who was burdened with the responsibility to pay off her older sister's debt. She was forced into becoming a spy for the high-ranking adventurers of Zetsuya to spy on Makoto and his party.

The main villain of the story. She made deal with Makoto's parents to give them a life on earth in exchange for one of their future children to become the hero of their old world. However, because of her vain beauty preferences, the Goddess reneged on the deal; banishing Makoto to die, while kidnapping a weak-willed Otaku boy and a righteous, practical girl to serve the role instead.

Tsukuyomi is a moon god who was responsible for summoning Makoto to the Goddess' world, as per the agreement made with his parents. After witnessing how Makoto was treated by the Goddess, he bestows all of his power onto Makoto and gives him the freedom to live how he wants in the Goddess' world.

 /

Media

Light novels
The light novel is written by Kei Azumi and illustrated by Mitsuaki Matsumoto. It began serialization online in 2012 on the user-generated novel publishing website Shōsetsuka ni Narō, and it moved to the AlphaPolis website in 2016. It was also later acquired by AlphaPolis, who have published eighteen volumes since May 2013.

Manga
A manga adaptation with art by Kotora Kino has been serialized online via AlphaPolis' manga website since 2015 and has been collected in eleven tankōbon volumes.

Anime
An anime television series adaptation was announced on October 20, 2020. The series is animated by C2C and directed by Shinji Ishihira, with Kenta Ihara handling series' composition, Yukie Suzuki designing the characters, and Yasuharu Takanashi composing the series' music. It aired from July 7 to September 22, 2021, on Tokyo MX and other channels. Crunchyroll has acquired the license to the anime and will stream it worldwide excluding Asian territories. Medialink has licensed the series in Southeast Asia and South Asia, and is streaming it on their Ani-One YouTube channel, but this series is only viewable in their YouTube channel with Ani-One Ultra Membership scheme. The opening theme song, "Gamble", is performed by syudou while the ending theme song, "Beautiful Dreamer", is performed by Ezoshika Gourmet Club. On April 27, 2022, Crunchyroll announced that the series will receive an English dub, which premiered the following day.

After the series' final episode, a second season was announced.

Episode list

Reception
The first season of the anime series has the highest overseas sales record among all Nippon TV anime.

Notes

References

External links
  
  
  
  
 

2013 Japanese novels
2021 anime television series debuts
Anime and manga based on light novels
C2C (studio)
Crunchyroll anime
Isekai anime and manga
Isekai novels and light novels
Japanese webcomics
Light novels
Light novels first published online
Medialink
Shōnen manga
Shōsetsuka ni Narō
Tokyo MX original programming
Upcoming anime television series
Webcomics in print